Edward Asa Raymond (1791-1864) also, Asa Raymond, Junior was a Grand Master of the Masonic Grand Lodge of Massachusetts from 1849-1851 His later tenure as Grand Sovereign Commander of the Northern Masonic Jurisdiction of the Scottish Rite was marked by a schism in 1860 which resulted in two competing organizations which both claimed legitimacy. This schism was eventually resolved in 1867, after Raymond's death.

Personal life
Raymond was born, "Asa", but inserted the name "Edward" and officially changed his name on or around Feb 24, 1825. He was a member of the Amicable Lodge in Cambridge, Massachusetts.

Notes

Masonic Grand Masters